This is a list of Dirty Jobs DVDs and media that have been released in region 1 and 4 from the TV show Dirty Jobs.

Media

Downloadable
This is a list of Dirty Jobs episodes that were released online for download individually or as sets on iTunes. Amazon.com and Netflix also feature select streamable episodes.

DVD releases

Sets

Individual DVDs
This is a list of individual DVDs that are not on season or collection sets. For example, episodes featured here may be included on a season or collection set, but were sold on a different DVD as well. All DVDs in this list were released by Discovery.

Sets featured on
This is a list of DVD sets that Dirty Jobs has been featured on, but which do not feature Dirty Jobs exclusively.

Region 4
This is a list of DVD sets that were produced for region 4.

References

Dirty
Dirty Jobs
Dirty Jobs